Lake Burton is a lake in western Quebec, Canada, approximately 15 kilometres from Long Island, Nunavut in Hudson Bay.

Lakes of Nord-du-Québec